, translated as Iron Man Tiger Seven, was a Japanese tokusatsu television series that broadcast on Fuji TV from October 6, 1973 to March 30, 1974 with a total of 26 episodes, produced by P Productions.  Unlike Kaiketsu Lion-Maru and Fuun Lion-Maru which focuses on cat-based ninja heroes, this series is set in modern Japan. The international English title that P Productions refers to for overseas distribution is Tiger Seven.

Takigawa Go gets the power to transform into Tetsujin Tiger Seven from an artificial heart and a magic pendant. To transform, he utters the henshin (transformation) phrase "Tiger Spark".  Takigawa Go is played by Tatsuya Nanjô who also starred in Henshin Ninja Arashi.  Go rides a Suzuki motorcycle with rocket boosters. When he transforms into Tiger Seven, the motorcycle transforms as well to become "Spike Go".  Spike Go can drive itself, coming to its master's aid when Tiger Seven roars.

Tetsujin Tiger Seven was apparently P Productions' attempt at a Kamen Rider style series. They even hired Shunsuke Kikuchi, music composer of the first eight Kamen Rider television series, to write the music for this series.

Music
Opening Theme
 "Iron Man Tiger Seven" (Tetsujin Tiger Seven) music by Shunsuke Kikuchi, lyrics by Tomio Shinoda, vocals by Yuki Hide

Ending Theme
 "Run Tiger Seven" music by Shunsuke Kikuchi, lyrics by Tomio Shinoda, vocals by Columbia Cradle Club & Blue Angels

Cast
Takigawa Go/Iron Man Tiger Seven (voice): Tatsuya Nanjô
Iron Man Tiger Seven: Kazuo Kamoshida
Professor Takigawa: Shizuo Chujô
Kitagawa Shiro: Shunichi Tatsu
Sanpei Hayashi: Hironori Sakuma
June Aoki: Yuka Kumari
Jiro Aoki: Tomonori Yoshida
Crown Prince Gill: Ryotaro Maki
Crown Prince Gill (voice): Kiyoshi Kobayashi
Black Mask: Masayoshi Kimizuka:
Black Mask (voice): Hiroshi Masuoka
Narrator: Masâki Okabe

International Broadcast
The series has aired in Italy with a full Italian dub and has aired on private local TV channels during the 1980s under the name Tiger Man. 
It also aired in Brazil under Tiger Mask with a Brazilian Portuguese dub during the late 1980s.

References

External Links
 

1973 Japanese television series debuts
1974 Japanese television series endings
Japanese television series with live action and animation
Tokusatsu television series